John Bodkin fitz Richard was Mayor of Galway, 1518-19.

Bodkin was one of the four sons of Richard Bodkin. His brothers were James, Henry, and Laurence. John was married to Janet Morris, daughter of John Morris, town provost in 1477. He had several children, including Christopher Bodkin, Archbishop of Tuam (died 1572).

Bodkin was the Mayor responsible for passing a notorious town statute that forbade the Gaelic-Irish from making a nuisance of themselves in the town: "Neither O nor Mac shall strut nor swagger through the streets of Galway."

Mayor John Bodkin fitz Richard died in 1523.

See also
 Tribes of Galway
 Galway

References
 History of Galway, James Hardiman, Galway, 1820.
 Old Galway, Maureen Donovan O'Sullivan, 1942.
 Henry, William (2002). Role of Honour: The Mayors of Galway City 1485-2001. Galway: Galway City Council.  
 Martyn, Adrian (2016). The Tribes of Galway: 1124-1642

Mayors of Galway
Politicians from County Galway